This is a list of the tallest structures on the island of Ireland.

Those in Northern Ireland are denoted by a light blue background, the rest are in the Republic of Ireland.

Tallest churches

Tallest structures

Other categories

Entries in the list that are in Northern Ireland are denoted by an asterisk, the others being in the Republic of Ireland.

SculpturesSpire of Dublin, 120 m (394 ft)
Spire of Hope, St Anne’s Cathedral, Belfast*, 80m (262 ft)
Gantry Cranes"Samson", Harland and Wolff, Belfast*, 106 m (348 ft)
BridgesRiver Suir Bridge, Waterford, 100 m (330 ft)
Boyne River Bridge, 95 m (312 ft)
WindmillsKilgarvan Wind Farm (group of 14 wind turbines), 93 m (305 ft)
ObelisksWellington Monument, Phoenix Park, 63 m (207 ft) (Tallest in Europe)
LighthousesFastnet Rock Lighthouse, 44.5 m (146 ft)
StadiumsCroke Park, 40 m (131 ft)
Air traffic control towersDublin Airport ATC Tower, 86.9m
Moving sculpturesIrish Wave, Park West, Dublin, 35.4 m (116 ft) (Tallest in Europe)
Round towersKilmacduagh monastery, 34 m (112 ft)
CastlesNenagh Castle Keep, 31 m (102 ft)
Standing stonesPunchestown, 6.5 m (21 ft)
High crossesMuiredach's High Cross, Monasterboice, 6.45 m (21 ft)

Former

Bellacorick Cooling Tower, 89 m (290 ft), demolished 2007
Arrol Gantry, 70 m (228 ft), demolished 1969
Churchill House, Belfast, 66 m (215 ft), demolished 2004
Boyne Obelisk, 53 m (174 ft), destroyed 1923
Ballymun Flats, 42 m (136 ft), demolished 2004-2015
Nelson's Pillar Monument, 41 m (134 ft), destroyed 1966
Walker's Monument, 32 m (105 ft) destroyed 1973
Craigyhill Bonfire, 61 m (203 ft) destroyed 2022

See also
 List of tallest buildings in Ireland
 List of tallest buildings and structures in Belfast
List of tallest buildings and structures in Dublin

References

Other sources
 Tallest structures in Ireland
 

Ireland
Tallest structures